Flinton is a rural town and locality in the Western Downs Region, Queensland, Australia.

Geography 
The Moonie River flows through Flinton from east (Westmar) to west (St George); the town of Flinton is located just to the north of the river.

The Ula Ula State Forest is in the southern part of Flinton. Apart from this, the land is used for a mixture of crop growing and grazing on native vegetation.

History 
Flinton appears on a survey plan from 20 Sept 1916.

Flinton Provisional School opened on 26 June 1929 and closed in 1935.

Education 
There are no schools in Flinton. The nearest primary schools are Westmar State School in neighbouring Westmar to the east and Teelba State School in neighbouring Teelba to the north-west. The nearest secondary school is St George State High School in neighbouring St George to the south-west, but it is sufficiently far away that distance education or boarding school would be other options.

Attractions 
The Flinton Race Club hold horse-racing events at the Flinton Racecourse on Grills Road.

References

External links 
 

Towns in Queensland
Western Downs Region
Localities in Queensland